John Lovett may refer to:

John Lovett (American politician) (1761–1818), U.S. Representative from New York
John Lovett (American football coach) (born 1950)
John Lovett (tight end) (born 1996), American football player
John Lovett (baseball) (1877–1937), American baseball player
John M. Lovett (1943–2003), Australian government administrator

See also
Jon Lovett (born 1982), American speechwriter and media personality
Jon Lovitz (born 1957), American comedic actor
John Lovitt (1832–1908), Canadian politician, shipbuilder, and captain